Salgadinho is a city located in the state of Pernambuco, Brazil. Located  at 124.6 km away from Recife, capital of the state of Pernambuco. Has an estimated (IBGE 2020) population of 343,200 inhabitants.

Geography
 State - Pernambuco
 Region - Agreste Pernambucano
 Boundaries - João Alfredo   (N);  Passira    (S);  Limoeiro   (E);   Surubim    (W).
 Area - 88.81 km2
 Elevation - 232 m
 Hydrography - Capibaribe River
 Vegetation - Caatinga Hipoxerófila
 Climate - Semi arid hot
 Annual average temperature - 27.0 c
 Distance to Recife - 124.6 km

Economy
The main economic activities in Salgadinho are based in agribusiness, especially livestock such as cattle, goats and poultry.

Economic indicators

Economy by Sector
2006

Health indicators

References

Municipalities in Pernambuco